Baleshwar or Balesar Yadav (1942 - 2008) was a famous Bhojpuri folk singer. His singing Birha became very popular. He was born in Badanpur village of Madhuban area of Mau in eastern Uttar Pradesh, which is currently part of the district of Mau, situated on the banks of the Ghaghra River. Baleshwar is considered the first superstar of Bhojpuri world, many of his songs were copied in Bollywood.

His major popular songs are as follows:
 Saiya saajan
 Sasura Me Jayabu
 Dushman mile severe lekin matlabi yaar na mile
 Hum koileri chali jaib e lalmuniya ke mai
 Bikai A Babu BA Pass ghoda 
 Chali a Dhaniya Dadari k mela
 Babu k muh Jaise Faizabadi Banda, Dahej me mange le Hero Honda
 Pan kha la munni sadhe tin baje munni
Tin baje munni Jarur Milan, sadhe tin baje

Baleshwar Yadav has written this song, after getting inspired, Anjaan included the song in Amitabh Bachchan's film 'Aaj Ka Arjun'- Chali Aana Tu Paan ki Dukan pe Sadhe Tin Baje.
Baleshwar Yadav last performed in Suriname in 2008.

Awards
He was awarded the Yash Bharti Award in 1994 for his outstanding contribution to the music field. He was also awarded Maati Ratan Samman by Shaheed Shodha Sansthan.

References

Bhojpuri-language singers
Indian male folk singers
Singers from Uttar Pradesh
People from Mau
1942 births
2008 deaths
20th-century Indian male singers
20th-century Indian singers